The Radio Tisdas Sessions is a 2001 (see 2001 in music) album by the Malian group Tinariwen. The album was recorded at Kidal's local Tuareg station, Radio Tisdas, by producers Justin Adams and Lo'Jo. While Tinariwen had previously recorded several cassette-only albums for regional markets, The Radio Tisdas Sessions was their first on CD and their first to be distributed worldwide.

Track listing

References 

2001 albums
Tinariwen albums